Monirul Islam Tipu Politician of Narail District of Bangladesh and former member of Parliament for Narail-1 constituency in February 1996.

Career 
Monirul Islam Tipu is the general secretary of Narail district BNP. He was elected to parliament from Narail-1 as a Bangladesh Nationalist Party candidate in 15 February 1996 Bangladeshi general election.

References 

Living people
Year of birth missing (living people)
People from Narail District
Bangladesh Nationalist Party politicians
6th Jatiya Sangsad members